The stone quarries of ancient Egypt once produced quality stone for the construction of decorative monuments such as sculptures and obelisks. These quarries are now recognised archaeological sites. Eighty percent of the ancient quarry sites are in the Nile valley; some of them have disappeared under the waters of Lake Nasser and some others were lost due to modern mining activity.

Some of the sites are well identified and the chemical composition of their stones is also well known, allowing the geographical origin of most of the monuments to be traced using petrographic techniques, including neutron activation analysis.
 
In June 2006, the Supreme Council of Antiquities (SCA) of Egypt established a new department for conservation of ancient quarries and mines in Egypt. The new department was designed to work in close cooperation with the regional SCA offices, and special training programmes for Inspectors of Antiquities will be carried out to enable the regional authorities to tackle inventory, documentation, risk assessment and management of the ancient quarries and mines. 

This article details some of the most important ancient quarry sites in Egypt.

The quarries of Aswan 
The quarries of Aswan are located along the Nile in the city of Aswan. One of the known directors of the Aswan sites was Hori during the reign of Ramses III. In the present days, the quarry area is to become an open-air museum. 

Typical materials known from this site are:
 Red, grey, and black granite

Some of the monuments known to come from this site are:
 Cleopatra's Needle
 The unfinished obelisk still on site, at the northern quarry
 The unfinished partly worked obelisk base, discovered in 2005
 The sarcophagus made from granite at the burial chambers of the Third Dynasty Pharaoh Djoser at Saqqara and the Fourth Dynasty Pharaoh Sneferu at Dahshur
 Many burial chambers, sarcophagi, columns, and other structures in the pyramids of Khufu, Khafre and Menkaure at Giza

Gebel el Ahmar
Gebel el Ahmar is located near Cairo on the east bank of the Nile, near the suburb of Heliopolis. The name means Red Mountain. The site was in full production in the times of Amenhophis III, Akhenaton, Tutankhamon, and Ramses III. The quarry was directed by Huy, known as "Chief of the King's Works", and also by Hori.

Typical materials known from this site are:
 Celestine and quartzite or red sandstone

Some of the monuments known to come from this site are:
 The Colossi of Memnon

Silsileh 
It was a very well known quarrying area throughout all of ancient Egypt due to the quality of the building stone quarried there. The site is a rich archaeological area, with temples cut directly in the hills. Examples include the rock temple of Horemheb on the west bank. Many of the monuments here bear inscriptions of Hatshepsut, Amenhotep II, Ramesses II, Merenptah, and Ramesses III. The quarries and the stone temples here are visible from boats on the Nile.

Some of the monuments known to come from this site are:
 Temple of Horemheb

Edfu 

Some of the monuments known to come from this site are:
 Stone blocks used by the engineers of Septimius Severus to reconstruct the north Colossus of Memnon.

Wadi Hammamat 

Wadi Hammamat is a quarrying area located in the Eastern Desert of Egypt. This site is noted because it is described in the first ancient topographic map known, the Turin Papyrus Map, describing a quarrying expedition prepared for Ramesses IV.

Typical materials known from this site are:
 basalt
 basanite

Widan el-Faras
The quarry landscape of the Northern Faiyum Desert comprise both the Umm es-Sawan and Widan el-Faras basalt quarries, both exploited in the early third millennium BC.

Typical materials known from this site are:
 basalt
 gypsum

Muqattam hills
The Muqattam hills are a site located near Memphis.

Typical materials known from this site are:
 limestone

El Amarna
The El Amarna site is located a short distance from El Amarna.

Typical materials known from this site are:
 alabaster

Idahet
The site is located a few kilometres from Idahet, in barren desert terrain. It was abandoned during the Middle Kingdom.

Typical materials known from this site are:
 diorite

Gabal Abu Dukhan

The Gabal Abu Dukhan site, near modern Hurghada on Egypt's Red Sea coast, was particularly important for the Roman Empire. Pliny the Elder's Natural History stated that "imperial porphyry" was discovered at an isolated site in Egypt in 18 CE by a Roman legionary named Caius Cominius Leugas. The location of the site, known to the Romans as Mons Porphyrites, was lost for many centuries until rediscovered in the 19th century. It is the only source of imperial porphyry in the world.

Typical materials known from this site are:
 purple porphyry

Some of the monuments known to come from this site are:
The baptismal font in the Cathedral of Magdeburg, Germany.
The porphyry togas of the busts of Roman Emperors
Porphyry panels in the Pantheon
the Portrait of the Four Tetrarchs

Koptos
Koptos is located in Wadi Rohanu.

Typical materials known from this site are:
 black slate

Qurna
Qurna is located near Thebes. It was an active site during the reign of Amenhotep III.

Typical materials known from this site are:
 limestone

Other sites
Other important quarry sites include:
 Abu Rawash
 Tura
 Ed-Dibabiya, near Gebelein

References

External links 
 QuarryScapes project
 Stones of Ancient Egypt
 Quarries in Ancient Egypt
 Ancient Egyptian Quarries
 Ancient Egyptian resources: Stone
 Photo gallery of Gebel Silsileh

 List
Mining in Egypt
Ancient Egypt